Deutschland has been the name of a number of ships including:

 , the name of several steamships
 , the name of ships of the German Empire's Kaiserliche Marine
 , built for the German Kaiserliche Marine
 , an antarctic research vessel 
 , in World War I
 , a museum ship
 , class of ships known as pocket battleships
 
 , launched in 1960
 , a cruise ship launched in 1998

Ship names